Tall Ships Youth Trust is a sail training organisation in the United Kingdom that currently owns and operates four 22m/72 ft Challenger class racing yachts, a Catamaran and a Ketch. 

Tall Ships Youth Trust, formerly the Sail Training Association, based in Portsmouth, is a charity registered with the Charity Commission. It was founded in 1956 and is dedicated to the personal development of young people aged 12 to 25 through the crewing of ocean-going yachts. Thanks to this work with young people, Tall Ships Youth Trust is a member of The National Council for Voluntary Youth Services (NCVYS).

Tall Ships Youth Trust has operated a variety of craft; it used to own TS KI Sir Winston Churchill and TS K2 Malcolm Miller. These two three-masted topsail schooners are now privately owned and in the Mediterranean. Recently the TSYT operated a second sister-ship in addition to Stavros S Niarchos, the Prince William. However Prince William was removed from operational status at the end of 2007, to make way for the new Challenge 72 class yachts. In 2010 she was sold to the Pakistan Navy and renamed Rah Naward ("Swift Mover").

The Challenger yachts provide a flexible approach to sail training, allowing TSYT to scale the amount of sailings relative to demand (i.e. not all yachts need to sail).

The Challenger yachts were part of a 12 strong fleet of Challenge 72's built and used in the 2000/1 and 2004/5 BT Global Challenge. The purchase of the craft provides TSYT with four stable, reliable and extremely well tested craft to base a sail training program upon. In 2009 the charity acquired a catamaran used to provide a good solid platform for younger trainees.

See also

 Jubilee Sailing Trust
Lord Nelson
SV Tenacious
Sea Cadet Corps
Royalist
Prince William

References

External links
Tall Ships Youth Trust
The National Council for Voluntary Youth Services (NCVYS)

Sail training associations
Transport charities based in the United Kingdom
Youth organisations based in the United Kingdom
1956 establishments in the United Kingdom